Valona is an unincorporated community in Contra Costa County, California, United States. The similar village of Selby is located nearby. The ZIP Code is 94525. The community is inside area codes 510 and 341.

References

Unincorporated communities in California
Unincorporated communities in Contra Costa County, California